Shivani Mishra (born 14 January 1973) is an Indian-born international cricket umpire and referee who is currently based in Qatar, working with the Qatar Cricket Association. She is an ACC-affiliated Level 3 Coach, Level 2 Umpire and ICC-affiliated Match Referee. Additionally, she is an ICC Asia Coach Educator. She has officiated cricket matches as an umpire in Qatari local matches such as Men's Division Matches and also International matches such as the ICC Men's T20 Qualifier conducted in Kuwait. She was the first female to umpire in a T20 international men's match.

She was the first Asian woman to be a part of the ICC Development Panel for umpires. 
She coached Qatar Women's Cricket Team and imparted cricket education in various courses run by QCA.

In May 2019, the International Cricket Council named her as one of the eight women on the ICC Development Panel of Umpires.

See also
 List of Twenty20 International cricket umpires

References 

1973 births
Living people
Indian cricket coaches
Indian cricket umpires
People from Lucknow
Indian emigrants to Qatar
Indian expatriates in Qatar
Women cricket umpires